Sandro Silva may refer to:

 Sandro da Silva (born 1974), Brazilian football midfielder
 Sandro Silva (footballer) (born 1984), Brazilian football midfielder
 Sandro Silva (DJ) (born 1992), Dutch DJ and producer